Black Flame is an Italian black metal band, formed in 1998 in the districts surrounding the towns of Asti and Turin.

History
Black Flame was formed by Cardinale Italo Martire, Serpentrax and m:A Fog in 1998. They started playing black metal in a way generally perceived as "cold and raw" by the black metal scene, strongly influenced by the occult both musically and lyrically. There are very few traces of the band's first years of activity, since at that time the band had no official website and was communicating with fans and media only through letters or email.

"Welcome" and "Orgiastic Funeral" Demo era 2001-2002
Black Flame released their first two demos Welcome and Orgiastic Funeral in 2001 and 2002, followed by several live performances. Both demos raised a lot of interest in the band which culminated in the recruitment of the drummer m:A Fog by the Italian cult band Mortuary Drape. This event helped Black Flame to be known also outside Italy and as a result of this the German label Sombre Records released in late 2002 a 350 copies limited 7-inch EP entitled From Ashes I'll Reborn.

"The Third Revelation" and "Torment & Glory" Album era 2003-2004
The first full-length album by Black Flame was released in April 2003 with the title The Third Revelation and created a sort of speculation among media and public about considering it a proper full-length album or not, since it was self-released by the band. However, the media reacted very well to the record, adding a more official confirmation to the will of the band to consider it a proper first full release. This album included a cover version of the Mortuary Drape song "Abbot", with Mortuary Drape's original vocalist, Wildness Perversion on vocals, as a clear statement of a Band deeply rooted in the old school of extreme metal. The live activity of the band increased a lot in 2003 and culminated in a show with Norwegian bands Carpathian Forest and Tsjuder.
Their second full-length album, Torment and Glory, was released by Eerie Art Records in CD format in later 2004, accompanied by a release in LP format by the American label Shades of Death Records and a tape version by the Italian Bylec-Tum Prods.

"Conquering Purity" and "Imperivm" Album era 2005-2008
After doing some more live work, the band again returned to the studio and released their third full-length album, Conquering Purity, in May 2006, an album which was very well received. Reviews applauded in particular what was seen as the incredible intensity of the work and its genuine roots in the late 1980s' sound. The album featured Peter Kubik, guitarist from the Austrian band Abigor, as songwriter. In 2006, Black Flame became the first band to sign on Forces of Satan Records, the Norwegian record label run by Gorgoroth guitarist and founder Infernus. 
The complexity of Black Flame compositions, progressively increased through all the releases, brought them to add a second live session guitarist for the live performances, so in 2007 Tiorad from the band Adversam was added to the live line-up. With the four piece live line-up, Black Flame performed for the first time in Norway in the towns of Oslo and Stavanger, marking a very rare event for an Italian underground band.
Through this years the drummer m:A Fog has joined several other bands, establishing himself as a requested drummer: Glorior Belli (France), Slavia (Norway), Dissiplin (Norway), Janvs (Italy), and Dead to This World (Norway). This, however, has not halted the progress of Black Flame, who entered the One Voice Studios in November 2007 to record the new album Imperivm. The band's fourth full-length album, this was released in June 2008 through Forces of Satan Records and Regain Records. Imperivm was named "Album of the Month" in the June 2008 issue of Rock Hard Italy, and also received positive reviews in other notable metal magazines such as the German Rock Hard and Metal Hammer Italy.
Thanks to this grown visibility, Black Flame reached an endorsement deal with Gibson guitars and basses and Trick Drums.

"Septem" era and line up changes 2011-2014
In February 2011, Black Flame announced the release of a new album entitled Septem and was to be released in 2011 through Italian cult label Behemoth Productions/Masterpiece Distribution. It was also announced that the artwork for the album would be created by Niklas Sundin, guitarist of Swedish melodic death metal band Dark Tranquillity. In summer 2011, bass player Serpentrax was forced to leave the band for personal reasons.
This event marked the first line-up change in the band since its creation. The live activity performed in support of Septem album has been realized with a session live bass player, Gnosis from the band Mystical Fullmoon.
In December 2013, Black Flame released to the press a statement confirming that Tiorad and Gnosis have been officially added in the line-up.

"The Origin of Fire" and "Necrogenesis: Chants from the Grave" 2015-2019 
Black Flame surfaced again in 2014 by signing a deal with the Italian cult label Avantgarde Music for the release of one album. "The Origin of Fire" was released in 2015 and included collaborations with P.K. from Abigor and Iscariah (ex-Immortal). In 2016, Black Flame announced the departure of the bass player Gnosis, replaced in 2017 by Silent. With the new line-up, Black Flame signed a contract with the Italian label Dusktone and released "Necrogenesis: Chants from the Grave" in May 2019. Shortly after the release of the album, the band went on a European mini-tour with label-mates Opera IX, with which Black Flame also share the drummer, m:A Fog.

Members
 Italo "Cardinale Italo Martire" D'Urso - vocals, guitars (1998–present)
 Massimo "m:A Fog" Altomare - drums (1998–present)
 Eric "Tiorad" Da Roit - guitars (2007-2013 as session and since 2013 in the line-up)
 Silent - bass (2017–present)

Former members
 Diego "Serpentrax" Vanzo - bass (1998–2011)
 Carlo "Gnosis" Belli - bass (2011-2016)

Timeline

Discography

Full-length albums
The Third Revelation (2003) (self-released)
Torment and Glory (2004) (Eerie Art Records)
Conquering Purity (2006) (Worship Him Records)
Imperivm (2008) (Forces of Satan Records/Regain Records)
Septem (2011) (Behemoth Productions/Masterpiece Distribution)
The Origin of Fire (2015) (Avantgarde Music)
Necrogenesis: Chants from the Grave (2019) (Dusktone)

EPs
From Ashes I'll Reborn (7-inch) (2002) (Sombre Records)

Demos
Welcome (demo) (2001)
Orgiastic Funeral (demo) (2002)

Compilation albumsBlack Celtic Summit V (2004)Signvm Martis B.M.I.A. Compilation'' (2008)

References

External links
Official website
Official MySpace profile

Italian black metal musical groups
Forces of Satan Records artists
Musical groups established in 1998
1998 establishments in Italy